Muideen Ganiyu (born 5 May 1979) is a boxer from Nigeria, who participated in the 2004 Summer Olympics for his native West African country. There he was stopped in the quarterfinals of the Featherweight (57 kg) division by DPR Korea's eventual runner-up Song Guk Kim. One year earlier, he won the silver medal in the same weight division at the All-Africa Games in Abuja, Nigeria.

References
sports-reference

1979 births
Featherweight boxers
Olympic boxers of Nigeria
Living people
Boxers at the 2004 Summer Olympics
Nigerian male boxers
African Games silver medalists for Nigeria
African Games medalists in boxing
Competitors at the 2003 All-Africa Games
20th-century Nigerian people
21st-century Nigerian people